Paraguay competed at the 2019 Pan American Games in Lima, from July 26 to August 11, 2019.

The Paraguayan team consisted of 71 athletes (48 women and 23 men) competing in 18 sports. This marked the largest ever team the country has ever sent to the Pan American Games.

During the opening ceremony of the games, table tennis athlete Alejandro Toranzos carried the flag of the country as part of the parade of nations.

Paraguay won a total of five medals at the games, a record for one edition of the games. The country also won its first ever gold medal at the Pan American Games when golfer Fabrizio Zanotti won the men's individual event.

Competitors
The following is the list of number of competitors (per gender) participating at the games per sport/discipline.

Medallists
The following competitors from Paraguay won medals at the games. In the by discipline sections below, medalists' names are bolded.

|  style="text-align:left; vertical-align:top;"|

|  style="text-align:left; width:22%; vertical-align:top;"|

Athletics (track and field)

Paraguay qualified three athletes (one man and two women).

Key
Note–Ranks given for track events are for the entire round
NR–National record

Track and road events
Men

Women
Field event

Combined events – Heptathlon

Basketball

Paraguay qualified a women's team (of 12 athletes) by finishing in the top seven nations at the 2017 FIBA Women's AmeriCup. This marks the country's debut in women's basketball at the Pan American Games.

Women's tournament

Roster

Source:

Group A

Seventh place match

Beach volleyball

Paraguay qualified a women's pair. This will mark the debut of the country in this discipline at the Pan American Games.

Bodybuilding

Paraguay qualified one female bodybuilder.

Women

No results were provided for the prejudging round, with only the top six advancing.

Canoeing

Slalom
Paraguay qualified a total of one female slalom athlete.

Key
Note–Ranks given are within the heat
Q = Qualified for the next round directly
Women

Equestrian

Paraguay qualified one athlete in equestrian.

Jumping

Football

Paraguay qualified a women's team (of 18 athletes) by finishing in one of the three qualification spots at the 2018 Copa América Femenina.

Women's tournament

Roster
The following players were called up for the games.

Group A

Semifinals

Bronze medal match

Golf

Paraguay qualified a full team of four golfers (two men and two women).

Karate

Paraguay qualified one female karateka in the kumite discipline.

Kumite
Women

Roller sports

Paraguay qualified one male skater in the artistic discipline.

Artistic

Rowing

Paraguay qualified seven rowers (five men and two women).

Men

Women

Sailing

Paraguay received a universality spot in the men's laser event.

Key
RET= Retired
STP= Standard penalty

Men

Shooting

Paraguay qualified 3 male sport shooters.

Men

Swimming

Paraguay qualified eight swimmers.

Men

Women

Table tennis

Paraguay qualified a men's team of three athletes by winning the bronze medal at the 2018 Pan American Championships in Santiago, Chile. Paraguay later qualified one female at the final qualification tournament.

Single and doubles

Team

Tennis

Paraguay qualified two female tennis players.

Women

Water skiing

Paraguay qualified one female wake boarder. This marks the country's Pan American Games debut in the sport.

Key
Note–Ranks given for are within the heat
LCQ = Qualified for the Last chance qualifying round
Q = Qualified for the next round directly
Women

Wrestling

Paraguay received one wild card in the men's freestyle discipline.

Freestyle
Men

See also
Paraguay at the 2020 Summer Olympics

References

Nations at the 2019 Pan American Games
Pan American Games
2019